"Son of Stimpy" (originally titled "Stimpy's First Fart") is the eleventh episode from the second season of The Ren & Stimpy Show. It originally aired on January 13, 1993.

Plot summary
Stimpy flatulates, and he believes that he has given birth. He tells Ren about the incident, but Ren won't believe him. Stimpy pines for his missing offspring which he names "Stinky" and relentlessly tries to find him. He eventually finds the gaseous child and joins Ren for Christmas.

Production
The episode's story is credited to John Kricfalusi, Vincent Waller and Richard Pursel, storyboarded by Peter Avanzino, and directed by the show's creator John Kricfalusi. John Kricfalusi originally conceived "Son of Stimpy" as a parody and critique of popular Hollywood melodramas (Bambi, E.T. the Extra-Terrestrial), and "fake pathos". He describes the latter as an act of manipulation performed by film directors that involves using audio-visual cues and tricks, mainly music and cinematography, to trigger melancholy emotions in audience members. Kricfalusi, infuriated by this practice, referred to it as "cheap", "contrived", and "a dirty trick", while asserting his belief that real drama should come from engaging characters and believable acting, not from editing techniques. He also vented his frustration that dramatic features of this type ultimately gain more acclaim and recognition than simpler comedic films, which are generally seen as inferior. When writing this episode, he deliberately gave it the most ridiculous premise he could think of (Stimpy not being able to flatulate a second time) and used as many of the aforementioned filmic tricks as he could think of, to prove how easy it is to force viewers into crying over something that has little to no real substance.

Censorship
John Kricfalusi made this episode as an exchange: if he made heartwarming stories, Nickelodeon would let him make more gross stories. The mistletoe scene, in which Ren tries to lure Stimpy inside by the mistletoe, caused much dispute between Kricfalusi and Nickelodeon, who objected to its "homosexual undertones". According to Kricfalusi's commentary on the DVD, Nickelodeon ultimately decided to include the scene after hearing that its removal greatly upset a homosexual Spümcø artist. A short scene where Ren pushes Stimpy's Christmas present towards a picture of him is cut from the "First and Second Seasons" DVD. However, it is shown on the Sony Wonder VHS release, Nick and MTV airings, including Paramount+. Nickelodeon cut and never aired the part where Stimpy goes to the police to find his missing "son", only to be violently thrown out. The scene is retained on the same DVD release, and was also shown when it aired on Spike TV.

Reception
In An Introduction to Film Studies the episode is used as a case study and comments on the motifs in the episode.The 'Son of God' motif which underpins the cartoon, signalled in its title and its Christmas setting and soundtrack, allies the sacred and profane in a way that some might find provocative. Kricfalusi does not make this a coherent analogy, however, but self-evidently uses the 'openness' of the animated vocabulary for subversive purposes. A. J. Carson of tvdvdreviews.com praised the episode as "pitch-perfect send up of maudlin Christmas specials".

In 1993, the episode was nominated for the Primetime Emmy Award for Outstanding Animated Program (for Programming Less Than One Hour) at the 45th Primetime Emmy Awards.

In 2007, the episode was ranked No. 96 in the 100 Greatest Nicktoon Episodes Countdown.

References

The Ren & Stimpy Show
American Christmas television episodes
Flatulence in popular culture
American LGBT-related television episodes
1993 American television episodes